Foucauldian discourse analysis is a form of discourse analysis, focusing on power relationships in society as expressed through language and practices, and based on the theories of Michel Foucault.

Subject
Besides focusing on the meaning of a given discourse, the distinguishing characteristic of this approach is its stress on power relationships. These are expressed through language and behaviour, and the relationship between language and power. This form of analysis developed out of Foucault's genealogical work, where power was linked to the formation of discourse within specific historical periods. Some versions of this method stress the genealogical application of discourse analysis to illustrate how discourse is produced to govern social groups. The method analyses how the social world, expressed through language, is affected by various sources of power. As such, this approach is close to social constructivism, as the researcher tries to understand how our society is being shaped (or constructed) by language, which in turn reflects existing power relationships. The analysis attempts to understand how individuals view the world, and studies categorizations, personal and institutional relationships, ideology, and politics.

The approach was inspired by the work of both Michel Foucault and Jacques Derrida, and by critical theory.

Foucauldian discourse analysis, like much of critical theory, is often used in politically oriented studies. It is preferred by scholars who criticize more traditional forms of discourse analysis as failing to account for the political implications of discourse. Political power is gained by those in power being more knowledgeable and therefore more legitimate in exercising their control over others in both blatant and invisible ways.

Process
Kendall and Wickham outline five steps in using "Foucauldian discourse analysis". The first step is a simple recognition that discourse is a body of statements that are organized in a regular and systematic way. The subsequent four steps are based on the identification of rules on:
 how those statements are created;
 what can be said (written) and what cannot;
 how spaces in which new statements can be made are created;
 making practices material and discursive at the same time.

Areas of study

Studies employing the Foucauldian discourse analysis might look at how figures in authority use language to express their dominance, and request obedience and respect from those subordinate to them. The disciplinary interaction between authority and their followers emphasize the power dynamic found within the relationships. In a specific example, a study may look at the language used by teachers towards students, or military officers towards conscripts. This approach could also be used to study how language is used as a form of resistance to those in power. Foucauldian discourse analysis has also been deployed to illustrate how scholars and activists at times unwittingly reproduce the very discourses that they aim to challenge and overcome.

See also

References

Further reading
 Johannes Angermuller. Poststructuralist Discourse Analysis. Subjectivity in Enunciative Pragmatics. Postdisciplinary Studies in Discourse. Basingstoke, Houndmills: Palgrave Macmillan, 2014.
 Johannes Angermuller. Why There Is No Poststructuralism in France. The Making of An Intellectual Generation. London: Bloomsbury, 2015.
 Lucy Niall. A Dictionary of Postmodernism. Wiley-Blackwell, 2016.
 Sara Mills. Discourse: The New Critical Idiom. Series Editor: John Drakakis, Routledge, 1997.

Discourse analysis
Michel Foucault